The 1884 United States presidential election in Rhode Island took place on November 4, 1884, as part of the 1884 United States presidential election. Voters chose four representatives, or electors to the Electoral College, who voted for president and vice president.

Rhode Island voted for the Republican nominee, James G. Blaine, over the Democratic nominee, Grover Cleveland. Blaine won the state by a margin of 20.26%.

With 58.07% of the popular vote, Rhode Island would prove to be Blaine's fourth strongest victory in terms of percentage in the popular vote after Vermont, Minnesota and Kansas.

Results

See also
 United States presidential elections in Rhode Island

References

Rhode Island
1884
1884 Rhode Island elections